Hyloxalus patitae is a species of frogs in the family Dendrobatidae. It is endemic to Peru where it is only known from its type locality near Comunidad Nativa de Davis, Cordillera El Sira, Pasco Region. It might occur in the El Sira Communal Reserve.
Its natural habitats are humid rainforests, especially alongside small streams and near waterfalls. It is potentially threatened by logging in the lower parts of the Cordillera El Sira.

References

patitae
Endemic fauna of Peru
Amphibians of Peru
Frogs of South America
Amphibians described in 2003
Taxonomy articles created by Polbot